Danville is a predominantly White suburb, to the west of central Pretoria, in the City of Tshwane Metropolitan Municipality.

History
After the suburb's first name of Westlands was rejected, a naming competition was held. The suburb was name Danville after the WW2 commander of the Voortrekkerhoogte base, General Daniël Hermanus Pienaar, with the suburb proclaimed in February 1951.

Ever since the end of Apartheid, Danville itself has had a white majority, albeit with an ever-increasing black middle-class.

Schools 
In 1956 an Afrikaans and English medium primary school was established in Danville, Pretoria. This school is currently known as Laerskool Generaal Beyers on 102 Du Plessis street in Danville. This school has been an anchor of the community of Danville for over 60 years and its rich in history and tradition of Danville.

There are 2 more schools in the community of Danville, namely they are Laerskool Westerlig, a primary school that is found on 215 Marsburg Ave street and also Hoerskool Elandspoort, a high school that is found on 140 Albertyn street in Danville.

Judging by the structure of the education system in Danville, it is possible to recognize that Danville it is a primary Afrikaans speaking area. All schools in this area are Afrikaans and English medium.

Location 
Danville is found in the Pretoria West area, it lies 5 Kilometers from the Church Square, the heart of the Pretoria CBD. Danville lies West-North direction from the Voortrekker Monument.

Danville houses the famous Daspoort Tunnel that connects the suburb of Danville and Claremont and it is the only tunnel found in the Gauteng province and it took 40 months to be constructed, it was open on the 10th of August 1972.

Business 
Danville houses a number of commercial businesses that cater to the needs of the people of the community. The main retail activity in Danville takes place in the displaced retail center of KwikSpar, which is located on 106 Knight Street Danville.

Other business centers include Danmed Pharmarcy on the corner of Dan street and Hepburn street. Sasol Garage which is on Morkel Street and KFC is also on Morkel Street.

Transport 
The City of Tshwane Metropolitan Municipality bus service does operate in the Danville area as it is used by the community members to get to and from town for work or school purposes. The other mode of transport that is mostly used by the community is public taxis, they are mostly used because they are available all the time to transport passengers back and from the Pretoria CBD.

Landmark 
There are a handful churches in the area of Danville as many of the community members are religious. There are different churches that are mainly for Afrikaans speaking and seTshwana speaking.

Danville has a few of government owned infrastructure in the area like the Post Office on Heatlie Street that is used by majority of the community. There is also a Fire Station which is located on Morkel Street. A hospital that caters to all people of Pretoria West is also found in the Danville area, the Pretoria West Hospital which is found on corner of Sytze Wierda Ave street and Morkel Street.

See also 
 Daspoort Tunnel, a tunnel that links Danville with Daspoort.

References

Suburbs of Pretoria